Santhanaraman Vasudevan, usually known as S. Vasudevan (born 12 December 1955 Madras, India) is a former Tamil Nadu cricketer. He captained Tamil Nadu to a win in the 1987–88 Ranji Trophy. He took more than two hundred wickets in his first class career.

References
 Cricketarchive Profile
 Cricinfo Profile

Indian cricketers
Tamil Nadu cricketers
1955 births
Living people